Parade of Chaos is the sixth full-length album released by metalcore band Zao. Released on July 10, 2002 by Solid State/Tooth & Nail/EMI. This album was recorded similarly to (Self-Titled) with Scott and Jesse writing in the studio and Dan being absent until time to record vocals. This album was also recorded at the same time as the recording of the All Else Failed reissue. This album featured the departure of bassist Rob Horner.

Track listing

Credits
Zao
Daniel Weyandt - vocals
Scott Mellinger - guitar, bass
Jesse Smith - drums, guitar, vocals
Production
Barry Poynter - Engineer, Mixing, Producer
Brian Gardner - Mastering

Charts

Notes
"Free the Three" was inspired by the West Memphis Three, three young men who were tried and convicted of the murders of three boys in West Memphis, Arkansas on May 5, 1993.

Quotes
"This disc is incredible... Yet again, I am amazed by the imagination Zao shows in breaking the pre-conceived notions of what hardcore (or even hard music in general) should sound like." - Lambgoat.com

References

Zao (American band) albums
2002 albums
Tooth & Nail Records albums
Solid State Records albums